Ülo Tedre (12 February 1928 Tallinn – 9 March 2015) was an Estonian folklorist.

In 1951 he graduated from Tartu State University in Estonian philology a diploma thesis in folklore. After graduating he worked at Estonian SSR Academy of Sciences' Language and Literature Institute.

Awards
 Order of the White Star, III class.

Works

 "Eesti rahvalaulud" (1969–1972)

References

1928 births
2015 deaths
Estonian scholars
Estonian folklorists
Estonian folk-song collectors
University of Tartu alumni
Recipients of the Order of the White Star, 3rd Class
People from Tallinn
Burials at Rahumäe Cemetery